Li Jia (born January 1961) is a Chinese politician who served as chairman of the Inner Mongolia Regional Committee of the Chinese People's Political Consultative Conference from 2018 to 2019 and chairman of the Shanxi Provincial Committee of the Chinese People's Political Consultative Conference from 2019 to 2022.

He was a representative of the 18th and 19th National Congress of the Chinese Communist Party. He was an alternate member of the 18th and 19th Central Committee of the Chinese Communist Party. He was a member of the 13th National Committee of the Chinese People's Political Consultative Conference.

Biography 
Li was born in Dalian, Liaoning province. He joined the Communist Party in March 1985. He graduated from Northeastern University with a degree in science and technology philosophy and has a Ph. D. He is also a senior engineer. In the past he has served successively as the executive vice mayor of Shenyang, the deputy governor of Liaoning, and the head of the party's organization department in Inner Mongolia. From 2011 to 2018 he served as the deputy Communist Party Secretary of Inner Mongolia, and head of the regional Political and Legal Affairs Commission. He is an alternate member the 18th Central Committee of the Chinese Communist Party.

Investigation 
On 2 August 2022, Li was removed from public office. On August 24, he was removed from membership of China's top political advisory body, the Chinese People's Political Consultative Conference. On August 26, he was put under investigation for alleged "serious violations of discipline and laws" by the Central Commission for Discipline Inspection (CCDI), the party's internal disciplinary body, and the National Supervisory Commission, the highest anti-corruption agency of China. His qualification for representative of the 19th National Congress of the Chinese Communist Party was terminated, and demoted from provincial-ministerial level to deputy provincial-ministerial level, and will keep a position as 2nd-class investigator. The money and property that Li had received in the form of bribes, as well as any interest arising from them, will be turned over to the national treasury.

References 

Politicians from Dalian
1961 births
Living people
Political office-holders in Inner Mongolia
Political office-holders in Liaoning
Northeastern University (China) alumni
Alternate members of the 18th Central Committee of the Chinese Communist Party
Alternate members of the 19th Central Committee of the Chinese Communist Party